The 2006 United States House of Representatives election in Vermont was held on November 7, 2006 for representation of Vermont's at-large congressional district in the United States House of Representatives from January 3, 2007 to January 3, 2009.

Incumbent Congressman Bernie Sanders, an independent member of Congress who caucused with the Democrats, did not seek a ninth term in the House, instead running successfully for the United States Senate.

To replace Congressman Sanders, Democrat Peter Welch defeated Republican Martha Rainville by a surprisingly somewhat narrow margin in staunchly-liberal Vermont. As of 2022, this is the last federal election in which a Republican received more than 33% of the vote.

Democratic Primary

Candidates
Peter Welch, State Senate President pro tempore, nominee for Governor in 1990, and candidate for this seat in 1988

Results

Republican Primary

Candidates
Martha Rainville, former Vermont National Guard Adjutant General
Mark Shepard, State Senator

Results

General election

Polling

Results

References

Vermont

2006
2006 Vermont elections